Jaime Echevarría (born 31 October 1937) is a Spanish field hockey player. He competed in the men's tournament at the 1964 Summer Olympics.

References

External links
 

1937 births
Living people
Spanish male field hockey players
Olympic field hockey players of Spain
Field hockey players at the 1964 Summer Olympics
Sportspeople from Getxo
Sportspeople from Biscay
Field hockey players from the Basque Country (autonomous community)